Abercrave Rugby Football Club (Welsh: Clwb Rygbi Abercraf) is a Welsh rugby union team from Abercraf, which was founded in 1894. Abercrave currently have a Senior XV who play in the WRU Division Five South West league and is a feeder club for the Ospreys.

Abercrave RFC host several teams, and as well as the Senior XV, have a Second XV, Youth team and multiple junior sections.

Club history
Founded in 1894, the founding team that would become Abercrave RFC began playing on a field opposite the local church. The first team switched pitches several times before settling on a field behind the Lamb and Flag Inn. As with the majority of village teams in Wales, the club disbanded during the First World War, but reformed in 1919, using the Red Lion Inn as their unofficial headquarters. The club playing field changed again, and until 1945 the team played on grounds beside the River Tawe. The team finally settled at the Plas-y-Ddol in 1958, which has been the club's main ground to the present day.

Club honours
 2008/09 WRU Division Five South West - Champions

Notable former players

  Alun Donovan 
  Ness Flowers 
  Adam Jones
  Eddie Morgan
  Huw Richards
  Clive Rowlands

References

Rugby clubs established in 1894
Welsh rugby union teams
Sport in Powys